3G is a generation of standards for mobile telecommunication.

3G may also refer to:

Arts, entertainment, and media
 3G (film), a Bollywood film
 Apartment 3-G, an American newspaper comic strip about a trio of career women
 Stephane & 3G, a Georgian pop group
 3-G Home Video/3-G Productions, a distributor of various media on VHS in 1980s and 1990s

Computing and telecommunications
 Hutchison 3G, a brand name under which several UMTS-based mobile phone networks operate
 iPhone 3G, a smartphone sold by Apple Inc in 2008.
 iPhone 3GS, a smartphone sold by Apple Inc in 2009.
 NTFS-3G, an open-source cross-platform implementation of the Microsoft Windows NTFS file system

Government
 3G (countries) or Global Growth Generators countries (the most promising growth prospects countries)
 Global Governance Group (or GGG), an informal group of smaller and medium-sized counties represented in the G20 summits
 , COVID-19 health pass system in Germany and Austria where most venues and businesses in both countries are restricted to patrons who are either vaccinated, recovered from previous COVID-19 infection, or tested within 72 hours.

Other uses
 3G, a third-generation immigrant; see Immigrant generations
 3G Capital, a Brazilian investment firm
 3G pitch, a third-generation astroturf, used in many sports such as football
 CURB/Agajanian/3G Racing, a team in the Indy Racing League IndyCar Series and NASCAR Nationwide Series
 Sudan Yellow 3G, a yellow azo dye
 3G, a tram model produced by now-defunct Dutch company Beijnes

See also
 1G (disambiguation)
 2G (disambiguation)
 4G (disambiguation)
 5G (disambiguation)
 6G (disambiguation)
 7G (disambiguation)
 8G (disambiguation)
 9G (disambiguation)
 G3 (disambiguation)
 GGG (disambiguation)